Most mountain peaks of Canada lie in the west, specifically in British Columbia, Alberta, and the Yukon. Mountains can be found all over British Columbia while those in Alberta are mainly situated on the eastern side of the Canadian Rockies.

Alberta

Highest peaks

British Columbia

Manitoba

Baldy Mountain (Manitoba), highest summit in Manitoba
Hart Mountain (Manitoba), highest summit of the Porcupine Hills

New Brunswick

Mount Carleton, highest summit in New Brunswick and the Maritimes
Big Bald Mountain
Christmas Mountains, a series of mountains named after different Christmas themes
Notre Dame Mountains
Colonels Mountain
Sugarloaf Mountain
Crabbe Mountain
Poley Mountain
Sagamook Mountain
 Mount Head

Newfoundland and Labrador

Newfoundland

Cabox, the: highest summit of the Lewis Hills and the Island of Newfoundland
Gros Morne
Mount Musgrave
Peter Snout
Pic a Tenerife

Labrador

Bishop's Mitre
Brave Mountain, highest summit of the Kaumajet Mountains
Cirque Mountain
Man O'War Peak
Mealy Mountains High Point
Mount Caubvik, highest summit of the Torngat Mountains, in the province of Newfoundland and Labrador, and of Atlantic Canada
Peak 3400 Map 14E2

Northwest Territories

Cap Mountain, highest summit of the Franklin Mountains
Mount Nirvana, highest summit of the Mackenzie Mountains and the Northwest Territories
Mount Sir James MacBrien

Nova Scotia

North Mountain (Nova Scotia)
Nuttby Mountain, highest summit of the Cobequid Hills
South Mountain (Nova Scotia)
White Hill (Nova Scotia), highest summit of the Cape Breton Highlands and Nova Scotia

Nunavut

Angilaaq Mountain, highest summit of Bylot Island
Angna Mountain
Arrowhead Mountain
Barbeau Peak, highest summit of Ellesmere Island and Nunavut
Breidablik Peak
Commonwealth Mountain
Devon Ice Cap High Point, highest summit of Devon Island
Durham Heights
Highpointer Peak
Kisimngiuqtuq Peak
Malik Mountain
Melville Hills High Point, highest summit of the Melville Hills and continental Nunavut
Melville Island High Point, highest summit of Melville Island
Midgard Mountain
Midnight Sun Peak
Mount Arthur (Nunavut)
Mount Asgard
Mount Ayles
Mount Baldr
Mount Battle
Mount Beaufort
Mount Biederbick
Mount Eugene
Mount Odin, highest summit of Baffin Island
Mount Oxford (Nunavut)
Mount Thor
Mount Whisler
Outlook Peak, highest summit of Axel Heiberg Island
Peak 08-46
Peak 09-30
Peak 35-44
Peak 39-18
Penny Highland
Porsild Mountains
Qiajivik Mountain (key-a-jiv-ick)
Sillem Island High Point
South Ellesmere Ice Cap High Point
Stokes Mountain
Torngarsoak Mountain
Tupeq Mountain
Ukpik Peak
Victoria Island High Point, highest summit of Victoria Island
White Crown Mountain

Ontario

 Caribou Mountain
 High Rock
 Ishpatina Ridge, highest point of land in Ontario
 Maple Mountain
 Mount McKay
 Rib Mountain
 Tip Top Mountain

Prince Edward Island
Prince Edward Island High Point, highest summit of the province of Prince Edward Island

Quebec

Mont Brome, highest summit of the Collines Montérégiennes
Mont D'Iberville (Mount Caubvick), highest summit of the Monts Torngat and the Province of Quebec
Mont du Lac à Moïse, part of the Grands-Jardins National Park, Charlevoix Regional County Municipality
Mont du Lac des Cygnes, part of the Grands-Jardins National Park, Charlevoix Regional County Municipality
Mont Jacques-Cartier, highest summit of the Monts Chic-Chocs, and the Canadian Appalachians
Mont Raoul Blanchard, highest summit of the Laurentian Mountains
Mont Saint-Grégoire
Mont Saint-Hilaire
Mont Saint-Pierre
Mont Tremblant
Mont Wright, Quebec
Mont Yapeitso
Mount Babel (Quebec)
Mount Royal
Mount Albert (Quebec)
Mount Valin
Mont Mégantic
Mont Orford
Mont Gosford, highest summit in south of the Province of Quebec
Mont Owl's Head
Mont Sutton
Mont Saint-Pierre, Quebec
Mont des Pics, Quebec
Mont Xalibu
Mont Joseph-Fortin, Quebec
Mont Richardson, Quebec
Mont Olivine, Quebec
Mont Logan, Quebec
Mont Lyall, Quebec
Montagne aux Érables, in Montmagny Regional County Municipality
Montagne des Érables, in Charlevoix
Mount Édouard, in Le Fjord-du-Saguenay (MRC)

Saskatchewan
Cypress Hills (Canada), highest summit of the Province of Saskatchewan

Yukon

Basement Peak
Buckwell Peak
Dalton Peak
Detour Peak

See also

Outline of Canada
Bibliography of Canada
Index of Canada-related articles
Canada
Geography of Canada
:Category:Mountains of Canada

Physical geography
Topography
Topographic elevation
Topographic isolation
Topographic prominence
Topographic summit
Lists of mountains by region
List of mountain peaks of North America
List of mountain peaks of Greenland
Mountain peaks of Canada

List of volcanoes in Canada
The 100 Highest major mountain peaks of Canada
The 142 Ultra-prominent mountain peaks of Canada
The 100 Most topographically isolated major mountain peaks of Canada
List of mountain peaks of the Rocky Mountains
List of mountain peaks of the United States
List of mountain peaks of Mexico
List of mountain peaks of Central America
List of mountain peaks of the Caribbean

External links

 Atlas of Canada - Mountains
 Mountain Guide

 
Lists of landforms of Canada